This is a list of settlements in the province of Groningen, in the Netherlands.

References 
 GEOnet Names Server (GNS)
 ANWB Topografische Atlas Nederland, 2005
 VUGA's Alfabetische Plaatsnamengids van Nederland, 1997.

 
Groningen